Pahlavan Badi castle is a historical castle located in Taft County in Yazd Province, The longevity of this fortress dates back to the Ancient Persia.

References 

Castles in Iran